Eugene Patrick Kennedy (1919–2011) was an American biochemist known for his work on lipid metabolism and membrane function. He attended DePaul University and then became a PhD student at the University of Chicago. From 1959 to 1993 he worked at Harvard Medical School.

Awards and honors 
1958 Pfizer Award in Enzyme Chemistry
1961 elected to the American Philosophical Society
1964 elected to the National Academy of Sciences
1976 Gairdner Foundation International Award
1986 Passano Award
1986 Heinrich Wieland Prize
1992 William C. Rose Award
1993 elected to the American Philosophical Society

References 

1919 births
2011 deaths
American biochemists
Harvard Medical School people
Fellows of the American Academy of Arts and Sciences
Members of the United States National Academy of Sciences
University of Chicago alumni
DePaul University alumni
Members of the American Philosophical Society